Mangala Kisan  (born 6 June 1947) is an Indian politician from the Biju Janata Dal party. He was a Member of the Parliament of India representing Orissa in the Rajya Sabha, the upper house of the Indian Parliament. He is a Member of the Odisha Legislative Assembly representing Rajgangpur.

References

External links
Profile on Rajya Sabha website

1947 births
Living people
People from Odisha
Odisha politicians
Biju Janata Dal politicians
Rajya Sabha members from Odisha
People from Sundergarh district